Charles Chambers, better known by his stage name DJ Funk, is a Chicago house DJ who pioneered the ghetto house subgenre of house music. Through the 1990s, he built a regional reputation in the Chicago-Detroit region and in the Midwest rave scene. His 1999 album Booty House Anthems was distributed nationally and sold over one million copies. He founded the Funk Records label in 2006. He is included in Modulations, a 1998 film documentary of electronic music.

Discography

Albums
1992: Ghetto House Anthems
1993: Ghetto House Anthems 2
1999: Booty House Anthems
2006: Booty House Anthems 2
2013: Booty House Anthems 3

Additional album mixes:
I Love Ghetto
Freaky Stylz
Freaky Stylz 2
Mr. Big D**k
Bootyology
Booty Bounce 2000
Guest appearance on DJ V's Juke-A-Licious Side A

Remixes
Justice – "Let There Be Light (DJ Funk Remix)"

References

Living people
Year of birth missing (living people)
Musicians from Chicago
Record producers from Illinois
Hip hop record producers
African-American DJs
American electronic musicians
Electronic dance music DJs
21st-century African-American people